Paulo da Costa, born in Angola and raised in Portugal, is a bilingual Canadian-Portuguese author, editor and translator living in Canada.

Works

Fiction
Scent of a Lie - 2002 - Caribbean & Canada Commonwealth Writers Prize Best First Book 2003, 2002 W.O. Mitchell City of Calgary Book Prize, 2001 Cannongate Prize - Scotland.
O Perfume da Mentira - Livros Pé d'Orelha, 2012
The Green and Purple Skin of The World - Freehand Books, 2013
The Midwife of Torment & Other Stories, 55 sudden fictions – Guernica Editions, 2017

Non-Fiction
Beyond Bullfights and Ice Hockey, Essays on Identity, Language and Writing Culture, Boavista Press, 2015

Poetry
Notas-de-rodapé - Portuguese poems – Livros Pé d'Orelha, 2005

Literary translation
The Cartography of Being – Translated poems of  Nuno Júdice 1970-2005 LPO 2012

Audio chapbooks
 Notas-de-rodapé  - Portuguese poems – Livros Pé d'Orelha 2005
 Midwife of Torment & Other Stories - Livros Pé d'Orelha 2005
 Twenty Poems – English Poems - Livros Pé d'Orelha – 2006
 XX poemas - Portuguese poems - Livros Pé d'Orelha - 2006
 The Book of Catalogues – Livros Pé d'Orelha - 2010

Awards

2020 James H. Gray Award for Short Nonfiction
2003 Caribbean & Canada Region Commonwealth Writers Prize – First Book
2002 W.O. Mitchell City of Calgary Book Prize
2001 Canongate Short-Fiction Prize (Scotland)
1999 CBC Alberta Anthology – Short Story

Portuguese

2003 ProVerbo . Prémio – Poesia        (Poetry  Prize – Portuguese)
2003 ProVerbo . Prémio – Conto         (Short-Story  Prize – Portuguese)

References

External links
 Author Web Page
 Writers Union of Canada
 GoodReads

Angolan emigrants to Portugal
Portuguese emigrants to Canada
21st-century Canadian poets
21st-century Canadian novelists
Canadian male novelists
Living people
21st-century Portuguese poets
Canadian male poets
Portuguese male poets
21st-century Canadian male writers
1965 births

pt:Paulo da Costa (escritor)